The Samanid Empire also known as the Samanian Empire, Samanid dynasty, Samanid amirate, or simply as the Samanids) was a Persianate Sunni Muslim empire, of Iranian dehqan origin. The empire was centred  in Khorasan and Transoxiana; at its greatest extent encompassing Persia and Central Asia, from 819 to 999.

Four brothers—Nuh, Ahmad, Yahya, and Ilyas—founded the Samanid state. Each of them ruled territory under Abbasid suzerainty. In 892, Ismail Samani (892–907) united the Samanid state under one ruler, thus effectively putting an end to the feudal system used by the Samanids. It was also under him that the Samanids became independent of Abbasid authority.

The Samanid Empire is part of the Iranian Intermezzo, which saw the creation of a Persianate culture and identity that brought Iranian speech and traditions into the fold of the Islamic world. This later contributed to the formation of the Turko-Persian culture.

The Samanids promoted the arts, giving rise to the advancement of science and literature, and thus attracted scholars such as Rudaki, Ferdowsi, and Avicenna. While under Samanid control, Bukhara was a rival to Baghdad in its glory. Scholars note that the Samanids revived Persian language and culture more than the Buyids and the Saffarids while continuing to use Arabic for sciences as well as the religious studies. They considered themselves to be descendants of the Sasanian Empire. In a famous edict, Samanid authorities declared that "here, in this region, the language is Persian, and the kings of this realm are Persian kings."

History

Origins 

The Samanid dynasty was founded by Saman Khuda, his descendants became rulers of the Samanid Empire. He was a dehqan of Iranian origin from the village of Saman in Balkh province, in present-day northern Afghanistan. The earliest appearance of the Samanid family appears to be in Greater Khorasan rather than Transoxiana. In some sources, the Samanids claimed to be descended from the House of Mihran of Bahram Chobin. It has been claimed that the House of Saman belonged to the Oghuz Turks, although the veracity is unlikely. Originally a Zoroastrian, Saman Khuda converted to Islam during the governorship of Asad ibn Abdallah al-Qasri in Khorasan, and named his oldest son as Asad ibn Saman in the governor's honour. In 819, the governor of Greater Khorasan, Ghassan ibn Abbad, rewarded the four sons of Asad ibn Saman for their aid against the rebel Rafi ibn al-Layth. Nuh ibn Asad received Samarkand; Ahmad ibn Asad received Farghana; Yahya ibn Asad received Tashkent, and Ilyas ibn Asad received Herat.

Rise

The Samanid dynasty in Herat (819–857) 

Ilyas died in 856, and his son Ibrahim ibn Ilyas became his successor. The Tahirid governor of Khorasan, Muhammad ibn Tahir, subsequently appointed him as the commander of his army, and sent him on an expedition against the Saffarid ruler Ya'qub ibn al-Layth al-Saffar in Sistan. After facing defeat in battle near Pushang in 857, he fled to Nishapur, only to be captured by Ya'qub al-Saffar and sent to Sistan as a hostage.

The Samanid dynasty in Transoxiana (819–892) 

In 839/40, Nuh seized Isfijab from the nomadic pagan Turks living in the steppe. Consequently, he had a wall constructed around the city to protect it from their attacks. He died in 841/2—his two brothers Yahya and Ahmad, were then appointed as the joint rulers of the city by the Tahirid governor of Khorasan. After Yahya died in 855, Ahmad took control over Châch, thus becoming the ruler of most of Transoxiana. He died in 864/5; his son Nasr I received Farghana and Samarkand, while his other son Ya'qub received Châch (areas around modern Tashkent/Chachkent). Meanwhile, the Tahirids' authority had significantly weakened after suffering several defeats to Saffarid ruler Ya'qub al-Saffar. Hence, causing the Tahirids to lose their grip over the Samanids, who became more or less independent. Nasr I, used this opportunity to strengthen his authority by sending his brother Ismail to Bukhara, which was in an unstable condition after suffering from raids by the Afrighid dynasty of Khwarazm. When Ismail reached the city, he was warmly received by its inhabitants, who saw him as one who could restore order.

After not so long, disagreement over where to distribute tax money caused a conflict between the brothers. Ismail was eventually victorious in the dynastic struggle and took control of the Samanid state. However, Nasr had been the one who had been invested with Transoxiana, and the Abbasid caliphs continued to recognize him as the rightful ruler. Because of this, Ismail continued to recognize his brother as well, but Nasr was completely powerless, a situation that would continue until his death in August 892.

Final unification and height of power (892–907) 

Following Nasr's death, Ismail moved the capital of the Samanid dynasty from Samarkand to Bukhara. A few months later the Saffarid emir, Ya'qub al-Saffar, also died and was succeeded by his brother Amr ibn al-Layth, who saw himself as the heir of the Saffarids. In the spring of 900, Amr clashed with Ismail near Balkh, but was defeated and taken into captivity. Ismail thereafter sent him to Baghdad, where he was executed. Ismail was thereafter recognized as the ruler of all of Khorasan and Transoxiana by the caliph. Furthermore, he also received the investiture over Tabaristan, Ray and Isfahan. It was also during this period that the Afrighid dynasty was forced into submission.

Before Ismail Samani's major victory against the Saffarids, he had made various expeditions in Transoxiana; in 892, he put an end to the Principality of Ushrusana by seizing all of its lands. During the same period, he put an end to the Bukhar Khudas in Bukhara. In 893, Ismail Samani invaded the territories of the Karluk Turks, taking Talas and converting the Nestorian church there into a mosque. The same year, he conducted a campaign to gather slaves, taking ten to fifteen thousand captives.

In 900, Ismail sent an army under Muhammad ibn Harun al-Sarakhsi against Muhammad ibn Zayd, the Zaydi ruler of Tabaristan and Gorgan. The invasion was successful; Muhammad ibn Zayd was killed and Tabaristan was conquered by the Samanids. However, Muhammad ibn Harun shortly revolted, forcing Ismail himself to invade the region the following year. Muhammad ibn Harun thereafter fled to Daylam, while Ismail reconquered Tabaristan and Gorgan. In 901, Amr Saffari was defeated at the battle of Balkh by the Samanids, which reduced the Saffarid dynasty to a minor tributary in Sistan. It was during this period that the Samanids were at their height of power, ruling as far as Qazvin in the west and Peshawar in the east.

Ismail is known in history as a competent general and a strong ruler; many stories about him are written in Arabic and Persian sources. Furthermore, because of his campaigns in the north, his empire was so safe from enemy incursions that the defences of Bukhara and Samarkand went unused. However, this later had consequences; at the end of the dynasty, the walls—earlier strong, but now falling apart—were greatly missed by the Samanids, who were constantly under attack by the Karakhanids and other enemies.

Ismail died in November 907, and was succeeded by his son Ahmad Samani (r. 907–914).

Intermediate period (907–961) 

Not long after his accession, Ahmad invaded Sistan; by 911, Sistan was under complete Samanid control, and Ahmad's cousin Abu Salih Mansur was appointed as its governor. Meanwhile, an Alid named Hasan al-Utrush was slowly re-establishing Zaydi over Tabaristan. In 913, Ahmad sent an army under Muhammad ibn Sa'luk to deal with him. Although the Samanid army was much larger, Hasan managed to emerge victorious. Ahmad, before he could plan another expedition to Tabaristan, was the following year murdered by some of his slaves in a tent near Bukhara. During his reign, Ahmad is also said to have replaced the language of the court from Persian to Arabic, which made him unpopular among his subjects, and forced him to change it back to Persian. After Ahmad's death, his eight-year-old son Nasr II (r. 914–943) succeeded him.

Due to Nasr's youth, his prime minister Abu 'Abd-Allah al-Jaihani took care over most of the state affairs. Jaihani was not only an experienced administrator, but also a prominent geographer and greatly educated man. Almost right after Nasr II had ascended the throne, several revolts erupted, the most dangerous one being under his paternal grand-uncle, Ishaq ibn Ahmad, who seized Samarkand and began minting coins there, while his son Abu Salih Mansur seized Nishapur and several cities in Khorasan. Ishaq was eventually defeated and captured, while Abu Salih Mansur died of natural causes in 915. Some time later Nasr II once again had to deal with rebels; in 919, the governor of Khorasan, Husayn ibn Ali Marvarrudhi, rebelled against Samanid authority. Nasr responded by sending an army under Ahmad ibn Sahl to suppress the rebellion, which the latter managed to accomplish. After a few weeks, however, Ahmad shortly rebelled himself at Nishapur, made incursions into Gorgan, and then fortified himself in Merv to avoid a Samanid counter-attack. Nevertheless, the Samanid general Hamuya ibn Ali managed to lure Ahmad out of Merv, and defeated him in a battle at Marw al-Rudh; he was captured and imprisoned in Bukhara, where he remained until his death in 920.

In the west, Nasr II clashed several times with Daylamite and Gilite rulers; In 921, the Zaydids under the Gilite ruler Lili ibn al-Nu'man invaded Khorasan, but were defeated by the Simjurid general Simjur al-Dawati. Later in 930, a Dailamite military leader, Makan ibn Kaki, seized Tabaristan and Gurgan, and even took possession of Nishapur in western Khorasan. He was, however, forced to withdraw back to Tabaristan one year later, due to the threat that Samanids posed. Makan then returned to Tabaristan, where he was defeated by the Ziyarid ruler Mardavij, who managed to conquer the region. In 935, Nasr II re-established Samanid control in Gurgan and made Mardavij's successor Vushmgir his vassal. However, in 939 he declared independence, but was defeated the following year at Iskhabad.

In 943 several Samanid army officers, angry at Nasr's support of Isma'ili missionaries, formed a conspiracy to murder him. Nasr's son Nuh I, however, learned of the conspiracy. He went to a banquet designed to organize the plot and had the head of their leader cut off. To appease the other officers, he promised to stop the Isma'ili missionaries from continuing their activities. He then convinced his father to abdicate, who died of tuberculosis after a few months.

Right when Nuh I ascended the throne, a revolt erupted in Khwarazm, which he managed to suppress. Later in 945, he had to deal with the Muhtajid ruler Abu 'Ali Chaghani, who refused to relinquish his post as governor of Khorasan to Ibrahim ibn Simjur. Abu 'Ali Chaghani then rebelled, and was joined by several prominent figures such as Abu Mansur Muhammad, whom he appointed as his commander-in-chief. In 947, he installed Nuh's uncle Ibrahim ibn Ahmad as amir in Bukhara. Abu 'Ali Chaghani then returned to his domains in Chaghaniyan. Ibrahim, however, was unpopular with the people of Bukhara, and Nuh soon retaliated by retaking the city and blinding Ibrahim and two brothers.

When Abu Ali Chaghani received the news of the re-capture of Bukhara, he once again marched towards it, but was defeated by an army sent by Nuh and withdrew back to Chaghaniyan. After some time, he left the region and tried to obtain support from other Samanid vassals. Meanwhile, Nuh had Chaghaniyan ravaged and its capital sacked. Another battle shortly ensued between Abu 'Ali Chaghani and a Samanid army in Tukharistan, which resulted in a Samanid victory. Fortunately for Abu Ali Chaghani, he managed to secure the support of other Samanid vassals, such as the rulers of Khuttal, and the Kumiji mountain people, but in the end made peace with Nuh, who allowed him to keep Chaghaniyan in return for sending his son Abu'l Muzaffar Abdallah as hostage to Bukhara.

Alp Tigin, nominal vassal of the Samanids, conquered Ghazna in 962 from the Lawik dynasty. The fifth of these commanders was Sebüktigin, who governed Ḡazna for twenty years till 387 AH/997 CE with the title (as it appears from his tomb inscription) of al-ḥājeb al-ajall (most noble commander). He would later be the founder of an independent dynasty based in Ghazna, following the decline of the Samanid Empire in the 990s.

Decline and fall (961–999) 
The power of the Samanids began to crumble in the latter half of the 10th century. In 962, one of the ghulams, Alp Tigin, commander of the army in Khorasan, seized Ghazna and established himself there. His successors, however, including Sebük Tigin, continued to rule as Samanid "governors". With the weakened Samanids facing rising challenges from the Karakhanids for control of Transoxiana, Sebük later took control of all the provinces south of the Oxus and established the Ghaznavid Empire.

In 992, a Karakhanid, Harun Bughra Khan, grandson of the paramount tribal chief of the Karluk confederation Sultan Satuq Bughra Khan, captured Bukhara, the Samanid capital. Harun died shortly afterwards, however, and the Samanids returned to Bukhara. In 999, Nasr b. Ali, a nephew of Harun, returned and took possession of Bukhara, meeting little resistance. The Samanid domains were split up between the Ghaznavids, who gained Khorasan and Afghanistan, and the Karakhanids, who received Transoxiana; the Oxus River thus became the boundary between the two rival empires.

Isma'il Muntasir's attempt to resurrect the Samanid state (1000–1005) 

Isma'il Muntasir was the youngest son of Nuh II—he was imprisoned by the Karakhanids after their conquest of Bukhara in 999. Some time later, Isma'il managed to escape to Khwarazm, where he gained support. Driving the Karakhanids out of Bukhara, he then moved on to and captured Samarkand. The approach of the Karakhanid army, however, forced Isma'il to give up all of his possessions, following which he travelled to Khorasan, where he captured Nishapur. Mahmud's army, however, made its way to the region, and Isma'il decided it necessary to flee again.

In 1003 Isma'il came back to Transoxiana, where he requested and received assistance from the Oghuz Turks of the Zarafshan valley. They defeated the Karakhanids in several battles, even when Nasr Khan was involved. For various reasons, however, Isma'il came to feel that he could not rely on the Oghuz to restore him, so he went back to Khorasan. He tried to gain Mahmud's support for a campaign to restore the Samanid state, but failed. Some time afterwards, he returned to the Zarafshan valley, where he gained the support of the Oghuz and others. A Karakhanid army was defeated in May 1004, but subsequently the Oghuz deserted Isma'il during another battle, and his army fell apart.

Fleeing to Khorasan yet again, Isma'il attempted to reenter Transoxiana in the end of 1004. The Karakhanids stopped this and Isma'il was nearly killed. Following this, he sought the hospitality of an Arab tribe near Merv. Their chief, however, killed Isma'il in 1005. His death marked the defeat of the last attempt to restore the Samanid state. Descendants of the Samanid family continued to live in Transoxiana where they were well regarded, but their power was relatively broken.

Iranian intermezzo 
Along with several other states, the Samanid Empire was part of the Iranian Intermezzo, or "Persian renaissance". This period has been described as having a key importance in the formation of the Islamic civilization, both politically and culturally. In political terms, it saw an effective break up of the Abbasid power and the rise of several successor states such as the Samanids and Buyids while in cultural terms, it witnessed the rise of new Persian as an administrative and literary language.

Culture

Government 

The system of the Samanid state was modelled after the Abbasid system, which in turn was modelled after the Sasanian system. The ruler of the state was the amir, and the provinces were governed by appointed governors or local vassal rulers. The administrative, political and economic affairs were administered by the divan, and the Samanid bureaucracy used Arabic in its diplomatic discourses. The economy was managed by the mustawfi, diplomatic correspondence and important state papers by the diwanal-rasa'il, and the royal guard and military affairs by the sahib al-shurta. The main responsibility of both governors and local rulers was to collect taxes and support the Samanid ruler with troops if needed. The most important province in the Samanid Empire was Khorasan, which was initially given to a relative of the Samanid ruler or a local Iranian prince (such as the Muhtajids), but was later given to one of his most trusted slaves. The governor of Khorasan was normally the sipah-salar (commander-in-chief).

Like in the Abbasid Caliphate, Turkic slaves could rise to high office in the Samanid state, which would sometimes give them enough power to nearly make the ruler their puppet.

Cultural and religious efforts 

The Samanids revived Persian culture by patronizing Rudaki, Bal'ami and Daqiqi. The Samanids determinedly propagated Sunni Islam, and repressed Ismaili Shiism but were more tolerant of Twelver Shiism. Islamic architecture and Islamo-Persian culture was spread deep into the heartlands of Central Asia by the Samanids. Following the first complete translation of the Qur'an into Persian in the 9th century, populations under the Samanid empire began accepting Islam in significant numbers. The arabization of the Samanids was clearly minimal compared to the almost entirely arabized Tahirids. Despite Arabic literature and science flourishing in the Samanid Empire, its distance from Baghdad allowed the Samanids to be a crucial element in the renaissance of New Persian language and culture. This Persianate culture variant was the first to use a language besides Arabic in Islamic culture.

Although the Zoroastrian population had previously been suppressed by the Abbasid Caliphate, according to Al-Masudi, the Samanid empire still had fire-temples that were still being venerated by the present Zoroastrian population. Despite the fact that the Samanids professed Sunni Islam, however, they were much more tolerant towards its Zoroastrian population than the previous empires.

Through zealous missionary work as many as 30,000 tents of Turks came to profess Islam and later under the Ghaznavids more than 55,000 under the Hanafi school of thought. The mass conversion of the Turks to Islam eventually led to a growing influence of the Ghaznavids, who would later rule the region.

Under Nuh II, a Hanafi work, which was being used to contest Ismailism, was translated into Persian.

Agriculture and trading were the economic bases of the Samanid State. The Samanids heavily engaged in trade with Europe. Thousands of Samanid coins have been found in the Baltic and Scandinavia.

Literature 

During the 9th and 10th centuries, there was a large amount of growth in literature, mostly in poetry. It was during the Samanid period that Persian literature appeared in Transoxiana and was formally recognized. The advancement of an Islamic New Persian literature thus started in Transoxiana and Khorasan instead of Fars, the homeland of the Persians. The best known poets of the Samanid period were Rudaki (d. 941), Daqiqi (d. 977) and Ferdowsi (d. 1020).

Although Persian was the most-favored language, Arabic continued to enjoy a high status and was still popular among the members of the Samanid family. For example, al-Tha'alibi wrote an Arabic anthology named Yatimat al-dahr ("The Unique Pearl"). The fourth section of the anthology included a detailed account of the poets that lived under the Samanids. It also states that the poets of Khwarazm mostly wrote in Arabic.

The acknowledged founder of Persian classical poetry, and a man of great perception, was Rudaki, who was born in the village of Panjrudak, which is today part of the Panjakent District in Tajikistan. Rudaki was already becoming popular during his early years, due to his poems, his voice, and his great skill in using the chang (an Iranian instrument similar to the harp). He was shortly invited to the Samanid court, where he stayed almost the rest of his life. Fewer than 2,000 lines of his poetry have survived, but are enough to prove his great poetic skills—he perfected every basic verse form of medieval Persian poetry: mathnawi, qasida, ghazal and ruba'i.

"Look at the cloud, how it cries like a grieving man
 Thunder moans like a lover with a broken heart.
 Now and then the sun peeks from behind the clouds
 Like a prisoner hiding from the guard." – Rudaki

Another prominent poet was Shahid Balkhi, born in the village of Jakhudanak near Balkh. Not much is known about his life, but he is mentioned as being one of the best poets in the court of Nasr II, and one of the best scholars of the age. He was also a student of Rudaki, and had close relations with him. He died in 936, a few years before Rudaki's death. His death saddened Rudaki, who afterwards wrote an emotional elegy about him.

Daqiqi, who was a native of Tus, began his career at the court of the Muhtajid ruler Abu'l Muzaffar ibn Muhammad in Chaghaniyan, and was later invited to the Samanid court. Under the Samanids, a special interest arose in ancient Iranian legends and heroic traditions, thus inspiring Daqiqi to write the Shahnameh ("The Book of Kings"), a long epic poem based on the history of the Iranians. However, by his death in 977, he had only managed to complete a small part of it, which was about the conflict between Gushtasp and Arjasp.

However, the most prominent poet of that age was Ferdowsi, born in Tus in 940 to a dehqan family. It was during his youth that there was a period of growth under the Samanids. The rapid growth of interest in ancient Iranian history made him continue the work of Daqiqi, completing the Shahnameh in 994, only a few years before the fall of the Samanid Empire. He later completed a second version of the Shahnameh in 1010, which he presented to the Ghaznavid Sultan Mahmud. However, his work was not as appreciated by the Ghaznavids as it had been by the Samanids.

Population 

Under the Samanid Empire, the Zarafshan valley, Kashka Darya and Usrushana were populated by Sogdians; Tukharistan by the Bactrians; Khwarezm by the Khwarazmians; the Ferghana valley by the Ferghanans; southern Khorasan by Khorasanians; and the Pamir mountains and environs by the Saka and other early Iranian peoples. All these groups were of Iranian ethnicity and spoke dialects of Middle Iranian and New Persian. In the words of Negmatov, "they were the basis for the emergence and gradual consolidation of what became an Eastern Persian-Tajik ethnic identity."

Language 
Ferghana, Samarkand, and Bukhara were starting to be linguistically Persianized in originally Khwarazmian and Sogdian areas during Samanid rule. The Persian language spread and led to the extinction of Eastern Iranian languages like Bactrian and Khwarezmian with only a tiny amount of Sogdian-descended Yaghnobi speakers remaining among the now Persian-speaking Tajik population of Central Asia.  This was due to the fact that the Arab-Islamic army which invaded Central Asia at the time also included some Persians who later governed the region like the Samanids. Persian was rooted into Central Asia by the Samanids.

Intellectual life 
In the 9th and 10th centuries, intellectual life in Transoxiana and Khorasan reached a high level. In the words of N.N. Negmatov, "It was inevitable that the local Samanid dynasty, seeking support among its literate classes, should cultivate and promote local cultural traditions, literacy and literature."

The main Samanid towns – Bukhara, Samarkand, Balkh, Merv, Nishapur, Khujand, Bunjikath, Hulbuk, Termez and others, became the major cultural centres under the state. Scholars, poets, artists and other men of education from many Muslim countries assembled in the Samanid capital of Bukhara, where a rich soil was created for the prosper of creative thought, thus making it one of the most distinguished cultural centres of the Eastern world. An outstanding library known as Siwān al-hikma ("Storehouse of Wisdom") was put together in Bukhara, known for its various types of books.

Arts 
Due to extensive excavations at Nishapur, Iran, in the mid-twentieth century, Samanid pottery is well-represented in Islamic art collections around the world. These ceramics are largely made from earthenware and feature either calligraphic inscriptions of Arabic proverbs, or colorful figural decorations. The Arabic proverbs often speak to the values of "Adab" culture—hospitality, generosity, and modesty.

Legacy 

In commending the Samanids, the epic Persian poet Ferdowsi says of them:

کجا آن بزرگان ساسانیان
ز بهرامیان تا به سامانیان

"Where have all the great Sasanians gone?
From the Bahrāmids to the Samanids what has come upon?"

A Bukharian historian writing in 943 stated that Ismail Samani: was indeed worthy and right for padishahship. He was an intelligent, just, compassionate person, one possessing reason and prescience...he conducted affairs with justice and good ethics.  Whoever tyrannized people he would punish...In affairs of state he was always impartial.

The celebrated scholar Nizam al-Mulk, in his famous work Siyasatnama, stated that Ismail Samani: was extremely just, and his good qualities were many.  He had pure faith in God (to Him be power and glory) and he was generous to the poor – to name only one of his notable virtues.

The Somoni currency of Tajikistan is named after the Samanids.  A notable airline based in Dushanbe is also named Somon Air. Also, the highest mountain in Tajikistan and in the former Soviet Union is named after Ismail Samani. The mountain was formerly known as "Stalin Peak" and "Communism Peak" but in 1998 the name was officially changed to Ismoil Somoni Peak.

Samanid rulers

See also 

Iranian Intermezzo
List of Iranian dynasties and countries
List of kings of Iran
List of Sunni Muslim dynasties

Notes

References

Sources 

Daniel, Elton. (2001) The History of Iran (The Greenwood Histories of the Modern Nations) Westport, CT: Greenwood Press. ,

Further reading
 

 
Former countries in Western Asia
Sunni dynasties
Tabaristan
9th century in Iran
10th century in Iran
Empires and kingdoms of Iran
Medieval Khorasan
819 establishments
999 disestablishments
States and territories established in the 810s
States and territories disestablished in the 990s